Ostermeier is a German surname. Notable people with this surname include:

 Garnet Ostermeier (born 1961), German figure skater
 Hans-Arno Ostermeier, German military officer
 Thomas Ostermeier (born 1968), German theatre director

See also
 Ostermeyer

German-language surnames